Mottram St Andrew is a civil parish in Cheshire East, England. It contains 25 buildings that are recorded in the National Heritage List for England as designated listed buildings. Of these, three are listed at Grade II*, the middle grade, and the others are at Grade II. Apart from the village of Mottram St Andrew, the parish is rural. The listed buildings in the parish consists of country houses, one converted into a hotel, farmhouses, farm buildings, other houses and cottages, and a medieval cross.

Key

Buildings

See also
Listed buildings in Alderley Edge
Listed buildings in Over Alderley
Listed buildings in Prestbury
Listed buildings in Stockport
Listed buildings in Wilmslow

References

Citations

Sources

 

Listed buildings in the Borough of Cheshire East
Lists of listed buildings in Cheshire